Tracey T. Rosebud (born February 27, 1976) is an American politician serving as a member of the Mississippi House of Representatives from the 30th district. He assumed office on June 11, 2018.

Early life and education 
Rosebud was born in Charleston, Mississippi. He completed technical training in radiologic technology and science at Mississippi Delta Community College.

Career 
Rosebud worked as a project development manager for Metro Consulting Associates and founded Xtrinsic Solutions. He was elected to the Mississippi House of Representatives in a June 11, 2018 special election. During his tenure in the House, Rosebud has served as the vice chair of the Interstate Cooperation Committee.

References 

Living people
1976 births
People from Charleston, Mississippi
Mississippi Delta Community College alumni
Democratic Party members of the Mississippi House of Representatives